The 2020 London Broncos season was the 41st season in the clubs history and the first season out of the Super League after relegation in Super League XXIV. Coached by Danny Ward, the London Broncos competed in the Betfred Championship and the 2020 Challenge Cup.

It was their fifth season at the Trailfinders Sports Ground in West Ealing, London. The season was abandoned after five rounds, however the Broncos had already been eliminated from the Challenge Cup at the 4th round stage.

2020 squad

2020 standings
<noinclude>

References

External links
London Broncos - Rugby League Project
londonbroncosrl.com

2020 in rugby league by club
2020 in English rugby league
London Broncos seasons
2020 sports events in London